Bill Warren (born c. 1942), is a former corporate human resource executive with Rockwell International and former President of Monster.com. He is widely recognized as the founder of online recruiting. Warren was awarded the 1997 Employment Management Association’s prestigious Pericles Pro Meritus Award, an honor presented by EMA in recognition of being the founder of online recruiting on the Internet.

Warren is currently Executive Director of DirectEmployers Association, a non-profit consortium of 800 leading U.S. companies.
DirectEmployers Association services include the JobCentral National Labor Exchange, an alliance with The National Association of State Workforce Agencies (NASWA).

He was a graduate of Indiana University and a three-year United States Army veteran.

Online recruiting history
In August 1992, Bill Warren founded Online Career Center (OCC), the first employment site on the Internet.
He remained president of OCC after it was sold to TMP Worldwide (now Monster Worldwide) in December 1995.
OCC was renamed Monster.com and he was named president in December 1998. Warren left Monster.com in 2000.

References

American computer businesspeople
Indiana University alumni
Living people
United States Army soldiers
Year of birth uncertain
Monster.com
Year of birth missing (living people)